The chiasmatic cistern (cistern of chiasma, or suprasellar cistern) is formed as the interpeduncular cistern extends forward across the optic chiasm and onto the upper surface of the corpus callosum – the arachnoid stretches across from one cerebral hemisphere to the other immediately beneath the free border of the falx cerebri, and thus leaves a space in which the anterior cerebral arteries are contained.   The "leaf" or extension of the chiasmatic cistern above the chiasma, which is separated from the optic recess of the third ventricle by the thin lamina terminalis, has been called the suprachiasmatic cistern.  As spaces filled with freely circulating cerebrospinal fluid, cisterns receive little direct study, but are mentioned in pathological conditions.  Cysts and tumors of the lamina terminalis extend into the suprachiasmatic cistern, as can pituitary tumors, or the cistern can be partially or completely effaced by injury and hematoma or by blockage of the cerebral aqueduct.

References

External links
 NIF Search - Chiasmatic Cistern via the Neuroscience Information Framework

Meninges